Valley Township is the name of some places in the U.S. state of Pennsylvania:

Valley Township, Armstrong County, Pennsylvania
Valley Township, Chester County, Pennsylvania
Valley Township, Montour County, Pennsylvania

Pennsylvania township disambiguation pages